
Didier is a French masculine given name and surname common throughout the Romance languages. It comes from the Ancient Roman names Didius and Desiderius. During the 5th century AD, with the Christianisation of ancient pagan names, it has become associated with the name Desiderius, related to Latin desiderium – which can be translated as "ardent desire" or "the longed-for".

List
Notable people with the name include:

Given name
 Didier Agathe (born 1975), French footballer
 Didier André (born 1974), French race car driver 
 Didier Boulaud (born 1950), French senate member
 Didier Burkhalter (born 1960), Swiss politician 
 Didier of Cahors (c. 580–655), Desiderius or (saint) Didier, French saint
 Didier Couécou (born 1944), French footballer
 Didier Daeninckx (born 1949), French crime writer and politician
 Didier Delsalle (born 1957), French helicopter pilot
 Didier Deschamps (born 1968), French international footballer and manager
 Didier Diderot (1685–1759), French craftsman
 Didier Drogba (born 1978), Ivorian association football player
 Didier Flament (born 1951), French fencer
 Didier Hassoux, French investigative journalist
 Didier Lavergne, French make-up artist
 Didier Marouani (born 1953),  French musician, founder of music group "Space"
 Didier Ollé-Nicolle (born 1961) is French former footballer and football manager
 Didier Opertti (born 1937), Uruguayan political figure and lawyer
 Didier Pironi (1952–1987), French Formula One driver
 Didier Pittet (born 1957), Swiss immunologist
 Didier Raoult (born 1952), French physician and microbiologist.
 Didier Ratsiraka (1936–2021), Malagasy politician, President of Madagascar from 1975 to 1993 and from 1997 to 2002
 Didier Reynders (born 1958), Belgian politician
 Didier Sornette (born 1957), French physicist, economist, and risk manager.
 Didier Van Cauwelaert (born 1960), French author of Belgian descent 
 Didier Zokora (born 1980), Ivorian international footballer

Surname
 Candice Didier (born 1988), French figure skater
 Charles Didier (1805–1864), Swiss writer, poet and traveller
 Clint Didier (born 1959), American politician and football tight end in the NFL
 Eugene L. Didier (1838–1913), American writer
 Évelyne Didier (born 1948), French senate member
 John Peter Didier (1748–1823), U.S. politician, first State Treasurer of Missouri
 Laurent Didier (born 1984), Luxembourgish road bicycle racer
 Mel Didier (born 1927), American baseball player, coach, scout, and executive
 Raymond Didier (1920–1978), American college sports coach and administrator

See also
 Didier Kumalo, an Australian musical group
 Saint-Didier (disambiguation), name of several communes in France
 Henry de Sainct-Didier, 16th century fencing master

French masculine given names
French-language surnames